Kohlberg may refer to:

Places 
 Germany
 Kohlberg, Baden-Württemberg, in the district of Esslingen
 Kohlberg, Bavaria in the district of Neustadt (Waldnaab)
 Kohlberg (Pirna), in Saxony
 Kohlberg (Fichtelgebirge), a forested mountain made of quartz phyllite in north-east Bavaria

 Austria
 Kohlberg, Styria

 Poland
 Kołobrzeg, in Middle Pomerania, known as Kohlberg, aka Kolberg until the end of World War II
 Kolberg (film), 1945 German film set in and about here

People 
 Lawrence Kohlberg, American psychologist known for Lawrence Kohlberg's stages of moral development
Olga Bernstein Kohlberg, American clubwoman

Other uses 
 Kohlberg (surname)

See also 
 Kohlberg Kravis Roberts, private equity firm co-founded by Jerome Kohlberg, Jr.
 Kohlberg & Company, a private equity firm
 Kolberg (disambiguation)